Daugai (see also other names) is a small city in Alytus district municipality, Lithuania. The city has the Church of Divine Providence dating from 1862, extant bazaar square, Daugai Vladas Mironas secondary school, art school, agricultural school, kindergarten Bangelė, post office, cultural center, library, polyclinic and hospital, many commercial enterprises.

References

External links
 
Website of the secondary school 
Daugai at the International Jewish Cemetery Project.

Alytus District Municipality
Cities in Lithuania
Cities in Alytus County